Cremorne Point ferry wharf is located on the northern side of Sydney Harbour serving the Sydney suburb of Cremorne Point. It is served by Sydney Ferries Mosman services operated by First Fleet class ferries.

In June 2007, the wharf sank during a storm. It reopened in September 2007.

On 8 October 2014, the wharf closed for a rebuild. The existing wharf was demolished, with a new one built reopening on 5 February 2015.

Services

Interchanges
Keolis Downer Northern Beaches operates one route to and from Cremorne Point wharf:
225: to Neutral Bay wharf

References

External links

Cremorne Point Wharf at Transport for New South Wales (Archived 11 June 2019)
Cremorne Point Local Area Map Transport for NSW

Ferry wharves in Sydney